Moran Mazor (born 17 May 1991) is an Israeli singer. Mazor rose to fame as the winner of the first series of the Israeli reality show "Eyal Golan is Calling You" in 2011.

In 2013, Mazor won the Israeli national selection Kdam Eurovision 2013. She represented her country in the second semi-final of the Eurovision Song Contest 2013 in Malmö, Sweden, with the song "Rak bishvilo" (Only for him). The song failed to qualify for the final, placing 14th in the semi-final and scoring 40 points. In October 2013, the Israel Broadcasting Authority released a documentary about Moran's journey through Eurovision entitled "A Girl with Glasses."

Early life
Moran was born in Holon to a Jewish family of Georgian descent. In an interview, she said her parents migrated to Israel from Georgia in the early 1970s.

References

21st-century Israeli women singers
Eurovision Song Contest entrants of 2013
Eurovision Song Contest entrants for Israel
Israeli people of Georgian-Jewish descent
1991 births
Living people
People from Holon